The Shirley Abicair Show is an Australian television variety series which aired in 1958.

The series was produced with the intention of running for nine episodes. Two of the episodes were produced and aired live in Melbourne by station GTV-9, the other seven were produced in Sydney by station ATN-7. In Melbourne it occupied the time-slot previously held by The Astor Show.

Apart from Abicair, other performers who made appearances during the run of the series included singer Jimmy Parkinson, singer Bill McCormack, singer Toni Lamond, singer Ted Hamilton, harmonica group The Three Winds, vocal group The Moontones, violinist Maurice Stead, Arthur Duncan, singer Bill French, The Tunetwisters, Graeme Bell and Bill Newman

References

External links
The Shirley Abicair Show at IMDb

Seven Network original programming
Nine Network original programming
1958 Australian television series debuts
1958 Australian television series endings
Black-and-white Australian television shows
English-language television shows
Australian variety television shows
Australian live television series